HMS Parthian was a  which served with the Royal Navy during the First World War. The M class were an improvement on the previous , capable of higher speed. Launched on 3 July 1916, the ship was transferred to the Southwest Approaches during February 1917 to undertake anti-submarine and escort duties initially based from Cobh in Ireland. The vessel attacked a number of German U-boats that were sinking shipping in the area, and was part of the welcome for the first destroyers from the US Navy to serve in Europe during the war. After the Armistice of 11 November 1918, the ship was placed in reserve before being decommissioned and sold to be broken up on 8 November 1921.

Design and development
Parthian was one of sixteen s ordered by the British Admiralty in February 1915 as part of the Fourth War Construction Programme.

Armament consisted of three  Mk IV QF guns on the ship's centreline, with one on the forecastle, one aft on a raised platform and one between the middle and aft funnels. A single 2-pounder (40 mm) pom-pom anti-aircraft gun was carried, while torpedo armament consisted of two twin mounts for  torpedoes. The vessel had a complement of 76 officers and ratings.

Construction and career
Parthian was laid down by Scotts Shipbuilding and Engineering Company of Greenock with the yard number 472, launched on 3 July 1916 and completed on 7 September. The ship was named after Parthia, a belligerent nation found on the southeast of the Caspian Sea. The vessel was deployed as part of the Grand Fleet, joining the Fifteenth Destroyer Flotilla.

During February 1917, in response to increasing submarine activity in the Southwest Approaches, Parthian was one of four destroyers from the Grand Fleet allocated to Cobh, Ireland. On 10 March, the destroyer assisted SS Arataca in its defence from the submarine , driving the submarine away. On 29 April, the vessel pressed home an attack on an unidentified submarine, using gunfire and depth charges as well as attempting the ram the boat as it dived. They were the first vessels sent by the US to Europe. On 30 May, the destroyer unsuccessfully attacked , although a prisoner from the merchant ship  onboard the submarine claimed that the boat had been hit. However, the hard toll of working under these conditions took their toll and by 18 June, the ship had been transferred to Newport, Wales for rest and refitting. One of the destroyer's attacks was used by Admiral Sir Lewis Bayly in an address to American seamen:

After the Armistice of 11 November 1918 the Royal Navy returned to a peacetime level of mobilisation, and surplus vessels were placed in reserve. Parthian was initially transferred to Devonport on 15 October 1919, joining what would become more than twenty M class destroyers being made ready for retirement. The destroyer was decommissioned and sold to Slough Trading Co on 8 November 1921, being subsequently broken up in Germany.

Pennant numbers

References

Citations

Bibliography

 
 
 
 
 
 
 
 
 
 
 
 
 
 

1916 ships
Admiralty M-class destroyers
Ships built on the River Clyde
World War I destroyers of the United Kingdom